Sumio Shiratori (白鳥 澄夫 Shiratori Sumio) is a Japanese composer and music producer.

He is best known for composing the soundtrack to the 1990-1992 Moomin anime television series, based on the Moomin books and comic strips by illustrator and author Tove Jansson.

He is the husband and co-producer of the singer and songwriter Emiko Shiratori, and father of singer Maika Shiratori.

External links
 WOOD GREEN Sumio Shiratori's recording studio
 List of Moomin and other soundtracks at the official website of Emiko Shiratori

1948 births
Anime composers
Japanese composers
Japanese film score composers
Japanese male composers
Japanese male film score composers
Japanese male musicians
Japanese record producers
Living people